The Hong Kong women's 3x3 team is representative basketball team of Hong Kong, governed by the China Hong Kong Basketball Association.
It represents the region in international 3x3 (3 against 3) women's basketball competitions.

See also
Hong Kong men's national 3x3 team
Hong Kong women's national basketball team

References

Basketball in Hong Kong
Basketball teams in Hong Kong
Women's national 3x3 basketball teams
Basketball